Wilhelm Petersen may refer to:
Wilhelm Petersen (composer) (1890–1957), German composer and conductor
Wilhelm Petersen (entomologist) (1854–1933), Estonian entomologist and lepidopterist
Wilhelm Petersén (ice hockey) (1906–1988), Swedish ice hockey player

See also
 Vilhelm Petersen, Danish architect